The Ecclesiastical Jurisdiction Act 1531 (23 Hen 8 c 9) was an Act of the Parliament of England.

The whole Act was repealed by section 87 of, and Schedule 5 to, the Ecclesiastical Jurisdiction Measure 1963 (No 1).

Section 1
In this section, the words "by accion of dette or accion upon the case", the words from "by originall writte of dette" to "shalbe admitted" where first occurring, and the words from "in whiche accion" where last occurring to the end of the section were repealed by section 1 of, and Schedule 1 to, the Statute Law Revision Act 1948.

Section 4
This section was repealed by section 1 of, and Schedule 1 to, the Statute Law Revision Act 1948.

References
Halsbury's Statutes,

Acts of the Parliament of England (1485–1603)
1531 in law
1531 in England